The following is a list of Northern Line railway stations. There are 130 railway stations and halts in operation on the Northern Line, some serve major cities and some serve local villages in distant locations where road access is limited. Some station buildings date back over a hundred years, such as Khlong Maphlap Station on the Sawankhalok Branch Line.  Some station were rebuilt from wooden structures to modern Thai styled buildings such as Nakhon Sawan Station. The other category of buildings is the small, ornate style of wood-built stations such as Mae Tha Station.

Stations in operation

Closed Stations

Main Line

Sawankhalok Branch Line

See also 
Northern Line (Thailand)
Rail transport in Thailand

References 

Railway stations
Thailand
railway stations
Lists of railway stations